The Rock Album is a compilation album by British hard rock band Whitesnake, released on 19 June 2020 through Rhino Records. The album contains "revisited, remixed and remastered" versions of previously released songs, and is the first in a series called Red, White and Blues Trilogy.

Content
According to the album's executive producer David Coverdale, some songs "have been musically embellished where my co-producer Michael McIntyre, my new mixer Christopher Collier and I felt it appropriate or necessary to bring out the best in these songs."

The Rock Album includes a new song, "Always the Same", originally recorded for the band's 2019 album Flesh & Blood.

Track listing

Charts

References

2020 albums
Whitesnake compilation albums
Rhino Records albums